Loveland High School is a public high school located in Loveland, Colorado, United States. It is one of the five high schools in the Thompson R2-J School District.

Founded more than one hundred years ago, it is the oldest high school in the district. The first class of graduates left the institution in 1894, and the most recent location was opened in 1964. Before then the school was located in downtown Loveland where Bill Reed Middle School is located. Loveland High School is an International Baccalaureate World School, the inaugural class of which graduated in May 2009.

Demographics
Enrollment size is approximately 1,600 students distributed between grades 9-12, resulting in graduating classes of approximately 400 students. According to 2022-2023 data provided by the school district, the predominant ethnicities at the school are white (70.2%), hispanic (24.0%), and multi-ethnic (3.0%). The demographics of the school largely mirror the population of the city.

Academics
Academic performance as measured by mean SAT composite scores in 2021 and 2022 puts Loveland High School squarely in the middle of the pack nationally, performing within 1 deviation of the mean (2022 national mean composite score = 1050, standard deviation = 216).

Mascot
For much of its history the school mascot was the Indians. In 2020 a student-led effort to remove the mascot encouraged the school board to pass a resolution retiring the Indian mascot at Loveland High School and the closely-related Warrior mascot at nearby Bill Reed Middle School. The driver for changing the mascot was sentiment that Native American mascots were deemed by the school board to be harmful and perpetuating of derogatory stereotypes. The replacement mascot was decided on by community input and the school board unveiled the Red Wolves as the new mascot for the school on October 7, 2020. The school colors remained the same red and black as they had been before the mascot change.

Notable alumni

 Jeremy Bloom, Olympian and professional football player
 Jeff Byers, former center for the Carolina Panthers
 Eddie Dove, former cornerback for the San Francisco 49ers (1959–63) and New York Giants (1963)
 Alec Hansen, second round pick in the 2016 MLB Draft by the Chicago White Sox
 Collin Klein, quarterback coach at Kansas State University and 2012 Heisman Finalist
 Scot McCloughan, former general manager of the Washington Football Team
 Ryan Wood, co-founder of the Under Armour company

References

External links
 

Public high schools in Colorado
Loveland, Colorado
International Baccalaureate schools in Colorado
Educational institutions established in 1894
Schools in Larimer County, Colorado
1894 establishments in Colorado